Parasporobacterium is a Gram-negative and strictly anaerobic bacterial genus from the family of Lachnospiraceae with one known species (Parasporobacterium paucivorans).

References

Lachnospiraceae
Monotypic bacteria genera
Bacteria genera